is a Japanese third-sector railway company funded by Shiga Prefecture and the city of Koka.

The railway operates the Shigaraki Line, a former JR West line that was transferred to the third sector in 1987. The Shigaraki Line connects Kibukawa on the JR West Kusatsu Line with Shigaraki.

Route data
Operating Company: 
Shigaraki Kohgen Railway Co. 
Distance:
Kibukawa — Shigaraki: 14.7 km
Gauge: 
Stations: 6
Double-track: None
Electrification: Not electrified

Stations

Rolling stock
 SKR310 series (since 2001)
 SKR400 series (since 2015)
 SKR500 series (since 5 February 2017)

, the company operates a fleet of four diesel railcars: SKR310 series cars SKR311 and SKR312, SKR400 series car SKR401, and SKR500 series car SKR501. The two SKR310 series diesel railcars were introduced in 2001, based on the earlier SKR300 series design but with more powerful engines. SKR400 series diesel railcar SKR401 was delivered to the line in September 2015. This replaced car SKR301, which was withdrawn from service on 3 October 2015. New SKR500 series diesel railcar SKR501 entered revenue service on the line from 5 February 2017. This replaced SKR205, which made its last run on 4 February 2017. While similar in design to the earlier SKR400 series car SKR401, SKR501 has transverse seating, whereas SKR401 has longitudinal bench seating.

Former rolling stock
 SKR200 series (x5, from 1987 until February 2017)
 SKR300 series (x1, from 1995 until October 2015)

Five SKR200 series railcars were introduced between 1987 and 1992. One SKR300 series car was introduced in 1995.

History

The line was opened by the Japanese Government Railways on May 8, 1933. Freight services ceased in 1982.

The company was established on February 10, 1987, and started the railway operation on July 13, 1987, following the end of the operation by JR West the day before. Originally the company owned the railway facilities, but on April 1, 2013, the asset was transferred to the city of Kōka for 10-year free lease to the company as a part of the restructuring.

Service disruptions
The line has an unfortunate record in this regard, with services suspended between 1943 and 1947 due to it being deemed non-essential during World War II and the track was removed. The citizens' volunteer work contributed to the reopening of the line on July 25, 1947.

A bridge was washed out in 1953, and the line was out of service for a year whilst it was rebuilt.

The 1991 collision (see below) resulted in the suspension of services for six months.

The line was out of service from September 16, 2013, to November 29, 2014, as a result of another bridge washout caused by Typhoon Man-yi.

Accidents

The Shigaraki train disaster happened on the line in May 1991, when a through train from JR West collided head-on with a Shigaraki Kohgen Railway train, killing 42 people.

See also
 List of railway lines in Japan

References

External links

  

Rail transport in Shiga Prefecture
Railway companies of Japan
Railway companies established in 1987
Japanese third-sector railway lines